John Louis Weimer III (born October 2, 1954) is an American judge who has served as the chief justice of the Supreme Court of Louisiana since 2021.

Weimer received a Juris Doctor from Louisiana State University in 1980. In 1995, he was elected District Judge for the 17th Judicial District Court. In 1998 he was elected as an Appellate Judge for the Louisiana Court of Appeal, First Circuit. He served in that capacity until he took his seat as Associate Justice of the Supreme Court in 2001. Weimer took the oath of office as Chief Justice of the Louisiana Supreme Court on January 7, 2021.

References

|-

20th-century American judges
21st-century American judges
1954 births
Chief Justices of the Louisiana Supreme Court
Justices of the Louisiana Supreme Court
Living people
Louisiana Democrats
Louisiana State University alumni
Louisiana State University Law Center alumni